Language Matters with Bob Holman is a 2015 documentary that focuses upon the rapid extinction of many of planet Earth's human languages and the multifarious struggles and efforts to save and preserve them. Holman states that "There are between 6,000 and 7,000 languages spoken in the world today. Languages have always come and gone but what is happening today is "a global crisis of massive proportions "... The feature is directed by David Grubin and narrated and hosted by Holman

The film was first broadcast on PBS in 2015 on the following dates; in New York City, Pittsburgh, San Francisco and Washington, DC on January 25, 2015 then on January 27 in Columbus, Ohio, on January 29 in Chicago and Los Angeles, on February 5, Boston and finally on February 23, in Syracuse.  Meanwhile, the film is being streamed on the Public Broadcasting Service's website www.PBS.ORG.

Critical reception

Levi Asher in writing for the online journal, Literary Kicks says in reviewing the film that... "it is a delightful and captivating two-hour documentary". He later concludes his commentary on the piece by stating, "Language Matters appears to be a television documentary about remote cultures and faraway peoples. It turns out to be a show about us all".

The Best American Poetry in reviewing the program on their blog states ...""Language Matters" is the first nationwide media recognition of the Language Crisis, which is not just about languages, but cultural diversity. It's about global homogenization, the Pringleization of society, about cultures being steamrolled under globalization"...

References

External links
 
 Language Matters full movie Streamed on PBS.org- 

Documentary films about words and language
2015 films
2015 documentary films
American documentary films
Films directed by David Grubin
Endangered languages projects
2010s American films